Karim Morani is an Indian film producer who has produced films like Chennai Express and Ra.One starring Shahrukh Khan. Morani and his brother Aly Morani co-own Cineyug, which is a film production and event management company.

Film career
Morani entered into film production in 1991 with a film called Yodha. The  film was directed by Rahul Rawail and starred Sanjay Dutt, Sunny Deol and Sangeeta Bijlani in lead roles. His next film as a producer came after a gap of twelve years; this was the film Dum direct by Eeshwar Nivas and starring Vivek Oberoi and Diya Mirza.

Another gap of eight years followed, and after this gap, all his films have been co-productions with Shar Rukh Khan of films that star Shah Rukh Khan. Morani's third release happened in 2011, after he teamed up with Shah Rukh Khan's production house Red Chillies Entertainment as an associate producer for the film Ra.One starring Shah Rukh Khan. In 2013, he co-produced the commercially successful film Chennai Express, and in 2014, he was the associate producer for the film Happy New Year, all of which films starred Shah Rukh Khan in the lead role. In 2015, Morani co-producer the film Dilwale in association with Red Chillies Entertainment and Gauri Shahrukh Khan. The film was directed by Rohit Shetty and starred Shah Rukh Khan, Varun Dhawan and Kajol.

Controversies
Morani has been dogged by several controversies during his career.

2G spectrum case
Morani is an alleged accused in the 2G spectrum case. The Income Tax Department and the Central Bureau of Investigation (CBI) claim that Morani  was a part of the conspiracy to illegally transfer funds to Kalaignar TV on the behest of Shahid Balwa and Vinod Goenka who are both co-accused in the 2G spectrum case. It was alleged that the promoters of DB Realty Shahid Balwa and Vinod Goenka transferred ₹2,092.5 million (US$33 million) to Kusegaon Fruits and Vegetables, in which Shahid Balwa's brother was a director. Kusegaon Fruits and Vegetables then transferred ₹2 billion (US$31 million) to Cineyug Films, and Morani then transferred it to Kalaignar TV. Morani was charged with Criminal conspiracy to cause criminal breach of trust by a public servant, criminal conspiracy, cheating, forgery, fabrication of evidence and also booked under the Prevention of Corruption Act. Morani was arrested by the Central Bureau of Investigation on 30 May 2011 and was subsequently granted bail on 28 November 2011. As of August 2012, Morani is facing trial in 2G spectrum case and has to appear at a Special CBI Court in New Delhi.

Mumbai underworld
On 23 August 2014, members of the Ravi Pujari gang made an attempt on the life of Morani. In 2018, A Delhi-based Model accused Morani of rape, blackmail and threatening to eliminated by underworld connection.

Allegations of rape
In 2017 Morani was booked by Hyderabad police for the rape of a 25-year-old Delhi-based student. On 23 September 2017, Morani had to surrender to the Hyderabad police following the order by the Supreme Court refusing to give Morani anticipatory bail in the alleged  rape case against him.

Personal life
Karim Morani is an Ismaili Muslim. He married Zara Morani and the couple have two daughters, Zoa and Shaza. Their older daughter Zoa Morani is an actress. Shaza is married to Padmini Kolhapure and Tutu Sharma's son Priyaank Sharma.

References 

Hindi film producers
Indian Ismailis
Film producers from Mumbai
Living people
2G spectrum case
Year of birth missing (living people)
Khoja Ismailism
Gujarati people
People charged with corruption